Man Yee Wan New Village is a resettlement village in Sai Kung Town, Sai Kung District, Hong Kong.

History
Several villages were submerged as a consequence of the building of the High Island Reservoir in the 1970s. These included Lan Nai Wan Village and Sha Tsui Village. In 1975, 57 households from Lan Nai Wan Village, Sha Tsui Village, together with several households returning from overseas moved into Sai Kung Town, where the government had built 10 five-storey buildings on reclaimed land to accommodate them. The relocated village was called Man Yee Wan.

Streets
The streets of Man Yee Wan New Village are Man Nin Street, Yi Chun Street, Wan King Path and Sha Tsui Path.

See also
 Sha Tsui New Village

References

External links

 Delineation of area of existing village Man Yee Wan New Village (Sai Kung) for election of resident representative (2019 to 2022)

Villages in Sai Kung District, Hong Kong
Sai Kung Town